Walking Among the Living is the third studio album released by American country music singer Jon Randall. It is his third major-label album, and his first album since Willin' in 1999. This album includes the song "Whiskey Lullaby", which was also recorded by Brad Paisley as a duet with Alison Krauss on Paisley's 2003 album Mud on the Tires. Paisley's version was a Top 5 country hit in mid-2004. Singles released from Walking Among the Living include "Baby Won't You Come Home" and "I Shouldn't Do This", neither of which charted.

Track listing
"Baby Won't You Come Home" (Jon Randall) – 3:32
"In the Country" (Randall, Gary Scruggs) – 4:05
"North Carolina Moon" (Randall, Ronnie Stewart) – 5:02
"Somebody Else" (Randall) – 3:33
"Long Way Down" (Randall) – 4:11
"Whiskey Lullaby" (Randall, Bill Anderson) – 4:54
"Austin" (Randall) – 3:56
"I Shouldn't Do This" (Randall) – 3:48
"Reprise for Somebody Else" (Randall) – 0:55
"Coming Back for More" (Randall, Gary Nicholson) – 3:32
"Lonely for Awhile" (Randall, Nicholson) – 4:46
"Walking Among the Living" (Randall, Jessi Alexander) – 3:30
"No Southern Comfort" (Randall, John Scott Sherrill) – 3:53
"My Life" (Robert Lee Castleman) – 4:28

Personnel
Jessi Alexander – background vocals
Karen Elaine Bakunin – viola
Pat Bergeson – acoustic guitar, electric guitar, National guitar, gut string guitar, harmonica
Chris Brown – drums, percussion
Denyse Buffum – viola
Sam Bush – fiddle, mandolin, slide mandolin, background vocals
Steve Conn – piano, Hammond B-3 organ, accordion, Wurlitzer electric piano
Larry Corbett – cello
John Cowan – background vocals
Greg Davis – banjo
Dan Dugmore – pedal steel guitar
Glen Duncan – banjo, electric guitar
Stuart Duncan – fiddle, mandolin, octave violin
Béla Fleck – banjo
Vince Gill – background vocals
Kenny Greenberg – electric guitar
Trey Henry – double bass
Byron House – bass guitar, double bass
Rob Ickes – Dobro, lap steel guitar
Sonya Isaacs – background vocals
Carl Jackson – background vocals
Alison Krauss – background vocals
Andy Leftwich – fiddle, mandolin
Patty Loveless – background vocals
Carole Mukogawa – viola
Gary Nicholson – National guitar
Dave Pomeroy – bass guitar, double bass
Jon Randall – acoustic guitar, electric guitar, gut string guitar, vocals
Darrell Scott – background vocals
Rudy Stein – cello
Pete Wasner – piano, accordion, Hammond B-3 organ, Wurlitzer electric piano
Evan Wilson – viola

References
[ Walking Among the Living] at Allmusic

1999 albums
Epic Records albums
Jon Randall albums
Albums produced by George Massenburg